Anton Johanson (sometimes spelled Johansson) (28 January 1877 – 24 December 1952) was a Swedish football player and manager as well as a pioneer in Swedish football. He played for IFK Köping and IFK Stockholm during his career. He was one of the founders of the Swedish Football Association, of which he also was secretary from 1905 to 1922 and chairman from 1923 to 1937. He was part of the FIFA board from 1932 to 1938.

References 
 Alsiö, Martin, Frantz, Alf, Lindahl, Jimmy & Persson, Gunnar (2004). 100 år: Svenska fotbollförbundets jubileumsbok 1904-2004, del 2: statistiken. Vällingby: Stroemberg Media Group. .

1877 births
1952 deaths
Swedish footballers
Swedish football chairmen and investors
Swedish football managers
Sweden national football team managers
IFK Stockholm players
Chairmen of the Swedish Football Association
Association footballers not categorized by position